McBean Regional Transit Center, also known by its acronym MRTC, is a transit center and bus station located at 24375 Valencia Boulevard in the Valencia area of Santa Clarita, California, near the intersection of Valencia Boulevard and McBean Parkway. It is located next to the Westfield Valencia Town Center.

Bus service
City of Santa Clarita Transit, formerly known simply as Santa Clarita Transit, provides bus service from this transfer point within the Santa Clarita Valley and to/from North Hollywood in the San Fernando Valley. City of Santa Clarita Transit is operated by MV Transportation, under contract with the city of Santa Clarita. Routes 1, 2, 3, 4, 5, 6, 7, 12, 14, 501, and 636 serve this station.

On weekdays, City of Santa Clarita Transit operates commuter buses to/from Union Station in downtown Los Angeles and North Hollywood Station (operating seven days per week as the "NoHo Express/757"), allowing riders to access Metro Los Angeles rapid transit subway and light rail services, as well as Warner Center, Chatsworth, Burbank, Burbank Airport, Van Nuys, and Century City. Commuter Routes 791, 792, 794, 796, 797, and 799 service this station.

Kern Transit provides weekday service to/from Bakersfield via Frazier Park.

Amtrak Thruway and AVTA 790 Transporter buses do not utilize the facility, but rather stop at the nearby Newhall station.

The facility includes 289 spaces, benches, and public restrooms.

See also
Vista Canyon Multi-Modal Center

References 

Transit centers in the United States
Bus stations in Los Angeles County, California